Chelsea is a town in and the shire town (county seat) of Orange County, Vermont, United States. The population was 1,233 at the 2020 census.

Geography
Chelsea is located in a river valley in central Vermont. The First Branch of the White River travels through the valley and the town. Located in the center of town, in the village of Chelsea, are two commons.

According to the United States Census Bureau, the town has a total area of 39.9 square miles (103.4 km), of which 39.9 square miles (103.4 km) is land and 0.04 square mile (0.1 km) (0.05%) is water.

Demographics

As of the census of 2010, there were 1,238 people, 541 households, and 334 families residing in the town. Of the 541 household 117 had children under the age of 18 living within them.

The racial makeup of the town was 96.1% White, 0.6% African American, 0.2% Native American, 0.2% Asian, Hispanic or Latino of any race were 1.5% of the population.

The median age of residents is 48.3. The median household income is $49,500. 89.2% of adults have earned a high school diploma or higher level of education. 17.9% of individuals live below the poverty line.

History 
The town was founded on August 4, 1781. It was originally called Turnersburgh after settler Bela Turner. In 1788 the townspeople of Turnersburgh approved a bill to rename the town Chelsea.

The first small schoolhouses were established in the early 1800s. By 1845 there were 18 schools operating around the town. In 1852 the Chelsea Academy was built in the village district. The Chelsea Academy burnt in 1870. In 1913 the "new" Chelsea High School building was built, this building still houses the Chelsea Public School today.

Historic sites 
In 1983 the historic village center of Chelsea was placed on the National Register of Historic Places as the Chelsea Village Historic District. Chelsea also has two standalone structures listed on the National Register: the Congregational Church of Chelsea and the Moxley Covered Bridge.

Figure, the original Morgan horse, is buried in Chelsea.

Barn Quilt Trail 
In 2018 The Chelsea Arts Collective led a project to create a barn quilt trail in Chelsea. Barn quilts are painted pieces of plywood. Designs are often geometric and resemble the patchwork of a quilt.

Popular culture 
The following movies were filmed (either fully or partially) in Chelsea:

 The Last Stand Farmer (1976)
 The Gift of Love (1983)
 Vermont is for Lovers (1992)
 A Stranger in the Kingdom (1997)

Notable people 

 John L. Bacon, Chelsea and Hartford banker and State Treasurer
 Daniel Buck, US representative in the 4th States Congress
 Daniel Azro Ashley Buck, raised in Chelsea, US representative for Vermont in the 18th and 20th United States Congress
 David Whitney Curtis, member of the Wisconsin State Assembly
 William Hebard, resided in Chelsea, US representative for Vermont in the 31st and 32nd United States Congress
 F. Ray Keyser Sr., Justice of the Vermont Supreme Court
 F. Ray Keyser Jr., born and raised in Chelsea, 72nd governor of Vermont
 William A. Palmer, resided in Chelsea, US senator in the 15th and 16th United States Congress, 13th governor of Vermont
 William Freeman Vilas, born in Chelsea, United States Postmaster General, United States Secretary of the Interior, US senator for Wisconsin
 Stanley C. Wilson, resided in Chelsea, 62nd governor of Vermont
 John Young, born in Chelsea, US representative in the 24th and 27th United States Congress, 15th governor of New York

Footnotes

Further reading
 John Moore Comstock, Chelsea: The Origin of Chelsea, Vermont and a Record of its Institutions and Individuals. n.c.: n.p., 1944.
 Chelsea Historical Society, Inc., A History of Chelsea, Vermont 1784–1984. (Chelsea Historical Society, Inc., 1984).

External links
Chelsea Vermont Official Town Website

 
Towns in Vermont
County seats in Vermont
Towns in Orange County, Vermont